Langenau is a town in the district of Alb-Donau in Baden-Württemberg in Germany. It is situated 14 km northeast of Ulm.

Transport
Langenau is located directly on the Autobahn A7 and near the A8

Public transport is guaranteed by the Donau-Iller-Nahverkehrsverbund (DING). Langenau is connected to the national rail network via the Brenz Railway (Brenzbahn) from Ulm to Aalen.

Mayors
-April 2016: Wolfgang Mangold
May 2016-: Daniel Salemi He was elected in February 2016.

International relations

Langenau is twinned with:
  Albeck in Carinthia (Austria),
  Brand-Erbisdorf in Sachsen (Germany),
  Bridgend in Wales (Great Britain) and
  Somberek (Hungary).

Media
In Langenau appears the newspaper Südwest-Presse, which includes a weekly local edition "Langenau aktuell" Media Langenau date will appear.

Education
Langenau has three primary schools, a special education school, a Werkrealschule, a Realschule and the Robert Bosch school.

Religious Buildings
The Protestant Martinskirche with Baroque altar comes from the 14th century to 18 century.

The also Protestant St. Leonhardskirche, dates back to the 17/18th century. Century.

Parks
At Langenau town Wörth is a park with a water wheel, a lake and a playground.

Celebrations
Every year on the last weekend before the summer holidays, the traditional children's festival is held with a parade of schools.

Notable people
 The acting Bavarian war minister Albrecht Besserer von Thalfingen (1787–1839) was born in Langenau.
 Robert Bosch (1861-1942), founder of the Robert Bosch GmbH
 Gottlob Honold (1876–1923), engineer and inventor
 Hansjörg Schlager (1948–2004), sportsman (ski)
 Thure Riefenstein (born 1965), actor and director

See also
 There were plans for a federal highway Bundesautobahn 86 with an exit for Langenau until the 1970s.
 The German Armed Forces Military History Research Office was situated there from 1957 to 1958.
 There is a village in Poland Langowo (German: Langenau), that belongs to Baborów

References

Alb-Donau-Kreis
Württemberg